Butov is a Russian masculine surname, its feminine counterpart is Butova. It may refer to
Alla Butova (born 1950), Russian Olympic speed skater 
 Mikhail Butov, Russian author, winner of the 1999 Russian Booker Prize

Russian-language surnames